Girolomo "Momo" Adamo (1895–1956) was an Italian American mobster in the American Mafia. He lived in Chicago and Kansas City before moving to Los Angeles in the 1930s and soon became underboss to Jack Dragna in the Los Angeles crime family. His brother Joseph Adamo was also a member of the crime family. Both he and his brother were well connected criminals in San Diego, working with such mobsters as Frank Bompensiero and Jimmy (The Weasel) Fratianno. In 1950, Momo was arrested along with several members of Jack Dragna's family including Tom Dragna (brother), Louis Dragna (nephew), and two men named Frank Paul Dragna (his son and nephew, respectively) when Dragna fled the state after being named in the California Crime Commission report as a member of a crime syndicate in Los Angeles. The five of them were taken into custody by the Los Angeles Police Department, who believed they were responsible for bombing Mickey Cohen's home or knew who was. The men were all released without being charged, when the police couldn't find evidence of their involvement (Tom built the bomb, but otherwise none of them were involved).

When Jack Dragna died in 1956, the Los Angeles crime family cast a secret vote to see who would become the next boss. Momo was hoping as a long time L.A. Mob leader he would be elected. However, USC trained lawyer-turned-mobster Frank DeSimone was elected boss in what is believed to be a rigged election. DeSimone demoted Adamo, and Adamo moved to San Diego shortly after. In the same year, Adamo attempted a murder–suicide by shooting his wife Marie Adamo in the head, before shooting and killing himself. Marie ended up surviving. The reason for the attempted murder was never confirmed, but according to police informants, Adamo's shooting himself and Marie was possibly out of shame from Frank DeSimone raping Adamo's wife while being forced to watch. Many mob historians don't believe this story. Other sources have trouble believing the strait-laced DeSimone, living with his mother, a USC law school graduate and a practicing attorney, would have raped a mob associate's wife, or anyone else.  Adamo's wife Marie was having an affair during their marriage and an alternative theory given is that Adamo committed these actions after finding out about her affair. Marie Adamo who never talked about the shooting incident publicly, recovered and later married Frank Bompensiero, who was widowed after his wife Thelma died.

Notes

References

http://www.sandiegoreader.com/news/1999/mar/11/cover-fateful-check-us-grant/
http://www.sandiegoreader.com/news/1999/mar/18/cover-when-everything-was-lost/

1895 births
1956 suicides
American gangsters of Sicilian descent
Los Angeles crime family
Prohibition-era gangsters
Suicides by firearm in California